Key Stage 5 is a label used to describe the two years of education for students aged 16–18 and at sixth form or college. In England, Wales and Northern Ireland, aligning with previous Key Stages as labelled for the National Curriculum.

Key Stage 5 is also the stage of education where students go through more intense and challenging courses in very specific subjects like mathematics and physics. This stage is the last stage of secondary education for members of sixth form. When A levels are achieved, the students will be able to apply for university.

See also
Key Stage
Key Stage 1
Key Stage 2
Key Stage 3
Key Stage 4
GCE Advanced Level

School terminology
Educational stages
Secondary education in England
Secondary education in Wales
Secondary education in Northern Ireland